Aya Mohamed Majdi (born 1 August 1994) is an Egyptian born Qatari table tennis player. Trained by the Chinese coach Su Li, Aya won three gold medals — singles, doubles and team — at the 2010 GCC Championship in Doha.

Majdi made her Olympic debut in 2012, having qualified through one of the IOC’s Tripartite Commission invitation places.

References

1994 births
Living people
Sportspeople from Alexandria
Qatari female table tennis players
Olympic table tennis players of Qatar
Table tennis players at the 2012 Summer Olympics
Table tennis players at the 2010 Asian Games
Qatari people of Egyptian descent
Table tennis players at the 2014 Asian Games
Table tennis players at the 2018 Asian Games
Asian Games competitors for Qatar